{{DISPLAYTITLE:C22H32N2O2}}
The molecular formula C22H32N2O2 (molar mass: 356.50 g/mol, exact mass: 356.2464 u) may refer to:

 Dopexamine
 U-69,593

Molecular formulas